Mexicana Universal 2022 was the 4th edition of the Mexicana Universal beauty pageant. Débora Hallal of Sinaloa crowned Irma Miranda of Sonora as her successor at the end of the event, and will represent Mexico at the upcoming Miss Universe 2022. The other winners include Itzia García of Colima as Mexicana International 2023, Diana Robles of Guanajuato as Mexicana Hispanoamericana 2022, and Verónica Gamboa of Nayarit as Mexicana Latinoamericana 2023.

Results

Mexicana Universal 2022

Contestants 
31 contestants competed in Mexicana Universal 2022:

Withdrawals 
  Guerrero - Due a health problems Andrea Farril, Mexicana Universal Guerrero 2021 did not compete in Mexicana Universal 2022, but she will return next year.

Replacements
 – Christel Ortiz was the winner of Mexicana Universal Sinaloa 2021 but resigned from the title because of personal reasons. The Suplente/1st Runner-up, Deisy Unzueta represented Sinaloa in Mexicana Universal 2022.

Judges 
 Rebeca Tamez - Nuestra Belleza México 1996 from Tamaulipas
 Elisa Nájera - Nuestra Belleza México 2007 from Guanajuato
 Lorena Sevilla - Nuestra Belleza Internacional México 2015
 Andrea Toscano - Mexicana Universal 2018 from Colima
 Andrea Bazarte - Mexicana Hispanoamericana 2021 and Reina Hispanoamericana 2021

Notes

Debut 
 United States

Returns 
Last competed in 2019:
 Estado de Mexico
 Zacatecas

Withdrawals 
 Querétaro

References 

Mexicana Universal
2022 beauty pageants
2022 in Mexico
Beauty pageants in Mexico